Saint-Priest-la-Roche is a commune in the Loire department in central France.

Population

Amenities
There are two chambres d'hôtes in the village.

See also
Communes of the Loire department

References

Communes of Loire (department)